1094 Siberia is an Eunomian asteroid from the central regions of the asteroid belt. It was discovered on 12 February 1926, by Soviet astronomer Sergey Belyavsky at the Simeiz Observatory on the Crimean peninsula. It was named after the vast region of Siberia in North Asia.

Orbit and classification 

Siberia is a member of the Eunomia family, a prominent family of stony asteroids and the largest one in the intermediate main belt with more than 5,000 members. It orbits the Sun in the central main-belt at a distance of 2.2–2.9 AU once every 4 years and 1 month (1,483 days). Its orbit has an eccentricity of 0.13 and an inclination of 14° with respect to the ecliptic.

The body's observation arc begins at Heidelberg in June 1935, more than 9 years after its official discovery observation at Simeiz.

Naming 

The official naming citation was mentioned in The Names of the Minor Planets by Paul Herget in 1955.

Physical characteristics 

In the SMASS classification, Siberia is a Xk-subtype, that transitions from the X-type to the K-type asteroids, while the overall spectral type of the Eunomia family is that of a stony S-type asteroid. It is also an assumed X-type.

Slow rotation 

In December 2006, a first rotational lightcurve of Siberia was obtained from photometric observations by astronomers from New Zealand and Australia. Lightcurve analysis gave a rotation period of 21.15 hours with a brightness amplitude of 0.45 magnitude, indicating a non-spherical shape. While not being a slow rotator, Siberia has a longer than average rotation period, especially for its size.

Diameter and albedo 

According to the surveys carried out by the Infrared Astronomical Satellite IRAS, the Japanese Akari satellite and the NEOWISE mission of NASA's Wide-field Infrared Survey Explorer, Siberia measures between 17.08 and 18.79 kilometers in diameter and its surface has an albedo between 0.089 and 0.127.

The Collaborative Asteroid Lightcurve Link derives an albedo of 0.1227 and a diameter of 18.16 kilometers based on an absolute magnitude of 11.6.

In fiction 

 is mentioned briefly in John Varley's science fiction novel Rolling Thunder, where it is described as "an escape-proof prison" of the Republic of Mars.

References

External links 
 Lightcurve Database Query (LCDB), at www.minorplanet.info
 Dictionary of Minor Planet Names, Google books
 Asteroids and comets rotation curves, CdR – Geneva Observatory, Raoul Behrend
 Discovery Circumstances: Numbered Minor Planets (1)-(5000) – Minor Planet Center
 
 

001094
Discoveries by Sergei Belyavsky
Named minor planets
001094
19260212